Mohammad Ameri (also Romanized as Moḩammad ‘Āmerī and Moḩammad ‘Omari; also known as Madumari) is a village in Delvar Rural District of Delvar District, Tangestan County, Bushehr province, Iran. At the 2006 census, its population was 2,040 in 454 households. The following census in 2011 counted 2,293 people in 564 households. The latest census in 2016 showed a population of 2,499 people in 680 households; it was the largest village in its rural district.

References 

Populated places in Tangestan County